Saffron Henderson (born December 27, 1967) is a Canadian voice actress, actress, voice instructor and singer who often works with Ocean Productions in numerous anime dubs.

Career 
Henderson tends to be cast as mature and flirtatious women, young boys and teenage girls, as well as foreign women and motherly figures. Her best known roles are Kid Goku and Kid Gohan in Dragon Ball and Dragon Ball Z, Shenhua in Black Lagoon, Sachiko Yagami in Death Note, Lucrezia Noin in Gundam Wing and Oxnard in Hamtaro. She's the daughter of Bill Henderson, the lead guitarist and singer of the Canadian rock band Chilliwack, and has a younger sister named Camille, who is also a singer.

Henderson has appeared in live-action work roles, (including a brief appearance in The Fly II as Veronica Quaife replacing Geena Davis who had starred in the first film), the romantic comedy Cousins as Terri Costello, and Friday the 13th Part VIII: Jason Takes Manhattan as rocker J.J. who is killed by Jason Voorhees with her own guitar.

Henderson has also provided backing vocals on several albums, including for ex Free/Bad Company vocalist Paul Rodgers' 1999 album Electric, as well as being an instructor for the On the Mic Training voice-over training school in Vancouver.

In an interview with Toon Zone, Henderson said that, if she weren't an actress, she would have been a psychologist in order to help people with diabetes, from which she suffers. She mentions Peter Sellers as an influence and that she worked as a showgirl in Spain when she was seventeen.

Voice roles 
 .hack//Roots – Midori
 A Christmas Adventure... From a Book Called Wisely's Tales – Rachael, Cupid
 Adventures from the Book of Virtues – Julie
 Animated Classic Showcase – Various Characters
 Barbie Fairytopia: Magic of the Rainbow – Lumina
 Billy the Cat – Nelson
 Black Lagoon series – Shenhua, Frederica Sawyer/Sawyer the Cleaner, Mami
 Brandy and Mr. Whiskers – Additional Voices
 Cardcaptors – Vicky (episode 14)
 Class of the Titans – Padma
 Death Note – Sachiko Yagami
 Dragon Ball (BLT Productions/FUNimation dub) – Goku (episodes 1–13 and movie 1)
 Dragon Ball Z (FUNimation/Saban Entertainment dub) – Gohan (episodes 1–67 (edited into 53 episodes) and movie 3 (edited into 3 episodes))
 Dragon Ball Z (FUNimation/Pioneer dub) – Gohan (movies 1–3)
 Dragon Ball Z (Westwood Media/AB Groupe dub) – Gohan (episodes 108–165) 
 Dragon Ball Z Kai (Ocean Productions dub) – Gohan
 Fat Dog Mendoza – Gothic Girl, Cissy Poole
 Galaxy Express 999 (movie) – Tetsuro Hoshino
 Adieu Galaxy Express 999 – Tetsuro Hoshino
 Generation O! – Baby Powder
 The Girl Who Leapt Through Time – Kazuko Yoshiyama
 G.I. Joe Extreme – Additional Voices
 Hamtaro – Oxnard, Maria
 Inuyasha – Sōta Higurashi, Eri (First voices, later replaced with Rebecca Shoichet)
 Inuyasha the Movie: Affections Touching Across Time – Sōta Higurashi, Eri
 Inuyasha the Movie: The Castle Beyond the Looking Glass – Sōta Higurashi, Eri
 Joon Joon and Friends – King Pow, Josh Josh, Hannah Tatsuma
 Key the Metal Idol – Miho Utsuse, Beniko Komori
 Kleo the Misfit Unicorn
 Kong: The Animated Series – Lua
 Maison Ikkoku – Kentaro Ichinose
 Master Keaton – Natalya
 MegaMan NT Warrior – Manuela
 Mobile Suit Gundam: Encounters in Space – Yuki Nakasato
 Mobile Suit Gundam SEED – Aisha
 Mobile Suit Gundam Wing – Lucrezia Noin
 Monster Rancher – Sandra, Eared Mew, Pink Suezo, Furred Suezo
 My Little Pony: Dancing in the Clouds – Sky Wishes
 My Little Pony: Friends Are Never Far Away – Sky Wishes
 My Little Pony: Friendship Is Magic – Auntie Lofty (S09E12), Teddie Safari, Daring Do Collector (Trade Ya!)
 My Scene Goes Hollywood – Audra
 Naruto – Kurenai Yuhi (Episode 3, later replaced with Mary Elizabeth McGlynn)
 Nana – Junko Saotome
 Nicktoons: Battle for Volcano Island – Queen of the Myrmecs, Crab Follower #1, Crab Refugee #1, Crab Refugee #3
 Nilus the Sandman – Polly, Sugar
 Ninja Turtles: The Next Mutation – Vam-Mi
 Pocket Dragon Adventures – Princess Betty Bye Bell
 Powerpuff Girls Z – Brandy
 Ranma ½ – Tsubasa Kurenai (TV series), Kogane Musashi, additional voices
 RoboCop: Alpha Commando – Kudzu Bodine
 Roswell Conspiracies: Aliens, Myths and Legends – Nema Perrera
 Saber Marionette J – Edge, Bloodberry
 Sabrina, the Animated Series – Additional Voices
 Sherlock Holmes in the 22nd Century – Lois St. Clair
 Trouble Chocolate – Almond
 Tara Duncan: The Evil Empress – Tara Duncan
 The Adventures of Corduroy
 The Deep – Agnes De-Krester
 The Little Prince – Ilnios (The Planet of Bubble Gob)
 The Vision of Escaflowne – Yukari Uchida, Eriya, Celena Schezar, Naria (Bandai Entertainment dub)
 Troll Tales – Rude
 Trouble Chocolate – Almond, Green Tea
 Ultimate Book of Spells – Additional Voices
 Walter Melon – Additional Voices
 What About Mimi? – Mary Beth, Mrs. Grindstone
 World Trigger – Yōtarō Rindō, Yuu Kunichika
 X-Men: Evolution – Callisto
 Zatch Bell! – Sherry Belmont (episodes 1–85)
 Zatch Bell! Mamodo Battles – Sherry Belmont
 Zatch Bell! Mamodo Fury – Sherry Belmont
 Zoids: New Century Zero – Naomi Fluegel

Singing roles 
 Rainbow Fish (backing vocals, main title)
 The Bitsy Bears (main title)

References

External links 
 
 
 

Living people
Actresses from Vancouver
Canadian child singers
Canadian film actresses
Canadian television actresses
Canadian rock singers
Canadian video game actresses
Canadian voice actresses
Musicians from Vancouver
20th-century Canadian actresses
21st-century Canadian actresses
20th-century Canadian women singers
21st-century Canadian women singers
Canadian people of Scottish descent
1967 births